The Mutal Tiruvantati is a Tamil Hindu work of literature composed by Poigai Alvar, one of the twelve Alvars of Sri Vaishnavism. Composed of 100 verses in the poetic meter called the antati, it is part of the compendium of hymns called the Naalayira Divya Prabandham, composed in the seventh century CE.

Legend 
According to a Sri Vaishnava legend, Poigai Alvar once travelled to offer his veneration to Vishnu at the Ulagalantha Perumal temple at Tirukoilur. He met other two Alvars, Pey and Bhutath, whom he did not know, but who had also chosen to coincidentally visit the temple during the same period. During an ensuing rainstorm, Poigai found some accommodation at a mandapam, and was asked by Pey if he could share some space in his room. Observing that there was a single bed present in the mandapam, Poigai remarked that it would be most convenient for an individual to lie down upon the bed, but two to be seated. During this very moment, Bhutath arrived, and expressed the desire to share the mandapam with the other two poet-saints. The trio decided that it would be most proper for an individual to lie down, two people to be seated, but the fact that there were three of them meant that it would be most suitable for all of them to stand. Thus, three poet-saints stood all night, and during the dawn, they felt the presence of a fourth entity in their midst. The force collided against them, and overwhelmed them so much that each of them composed hymns regarding their experience, in the form of an antati. The entity is proclaimed to be Perumal. Mutal Tiruvantati is stated to be the hymns composed by Poigai Alvar, using the sunlight as his lamp.

Hymns 

The first hymn of the Mutal Tiruvantati elucidates his state of mind when Perumal overwhelmed him with his presence:
Poigai Alvar also references the Vamana and the Varaha incarnations of Vishnu in this work:

See also 
 Irantam Tiruvantati
 Munram Tiruvantati
 Nanmukan Tiruvantati

References 

Naalayira Divya Prabandham

External links 
Sri Poigai Alvar's Mutal Tiruvantati (Text and commentary) - N Rajagopalan
Tamil Hindu literature
Vaishnava texts